Řepín is a municipality and village in Mělník District in the Central Bohemian Region of the Czech Republic. It has about 700 inhabitants.

Administrative parts
The village of Živonín is an administrative part of Řepín.

Notable people
Josef Seger (1716–1782), organist, composer and educator

References

Villages in Mělník District